Dr. Jekyll and Mr. Hyde is a 1920 horror film directed and written by J. Charles Haydon, starring Sheldon Lewis, based on the 1886 novel Strange Case of Dr. Jekyll and Mr. Hyde by Robert Louis Stevenson. The Sheldon Lewis version was somewhat overshadowed by the 1920 Paramount Pictures version starring John Barrymore, which had been released just the month before.

Plot 
The atheistic Dr. Henry Jekyll (Lewis) embarks on a series of experiments determined to segregate the two sides of the human personality, good and evil, to disprove God's existence. His experiments cause his fiancée Bernice to call off their engagement, and in a rage, he manages to unleash the darkest part of his personality as Mr. Hyde. As the first transformation into Hyde begins, Jekyll's butler exclaims that Jekyll is now "the Apostle from Hell!"   Hyde, complete with fangs and scraggy hair, skulks through the city, committing such heinous acts as stealing a woman's purse and killing people.  The police eventually catch up with Hyde, interrogate him, put him in jail, and strap him into the electric chair. Sitting in his chair at home, Jekyll awakes violently from his nightmare to declare, "I believe in God! I have a soul..." and decides not to create the chemical potion and to embrace religion instead.

Cast 
 Sheldon Lewis as Dr. Jekyll / Mr. Hyde
 Alex Shannon as Dr. Lanyon
 Dora Mills Adams as Mrs. Lanyon
 Gladys Field as Bernice Lanyon
 Harold Foshay as Edward Utterson
 Leslie Austin as Danvers Carew

Production 
Sheldon Lewis went on to star in only one other horror film, Seven Footprints to Satan (1929), then his career wound down in 1936. Actress Gladys Field died in August 1920 in childbirth, a few weeks after the release of the picture.

There were three different adaptations of Robert Louis Stevenson's novel Strange Case of Dr Jekyll and Mr Hyde released in 1920. The first being the John Barrymore Paramount version, the second was the Sheldon Lewis film, and the third was Der Januskopf, a German film directed by F. W. Murnau. The film's producer, Louis Meyer (*not to be confused with Louis B. Mayer), was concerned about copyright infringement relating to the other two film versions of the story released that same year so he set the film in New York and altered the plot structure, although he may have also done it also for budgetary reasons. Contemporary newspaper accounts state this film went into production before the John Barrymore Paramount version, but the Paramount film was released first.

Technically, a fourth Dr. Jekyll and Mr. Hyde film was also released in 1920, although most reference sources ignore it. It was a satirical send-up of the John Barrymore film, produced by Hank Mann Comedies and distributed by Arrow just weeks before the company went out of business. Hank Mann played both Dr. Jekyll and Mr. Hyde in the film. It is considered a lost film and there is little information available about it.

Critique
Reviewer Troy Howarth commented "The script allows the character (of Dr. Jekyll) more background detail....but Lewis fails to bring him to life.The makeup is low key; some false teeth, matted hair and a cocked hat.....his frantic overacting makes the character unintentionally humorous....it's hard to believe even audiences of the period would've found him credibly sinister. The film was clearly made on the cheap and rushed through production." The final product was in fact so crude that director J. Charles Haydon had his name removed from the credits.

Notes
Sheldon Lewis returned once again in 1929 to play Dr. Jekyll in an early one-reel sound film short.

References 
Notes

Bibliography

External links

 
 

1920 films
American science fiction horror films
American silent feature films
American black-and-white films
Films based on horror novels
Films directed by J. Charles Haydon
Dr. Jekyll and Mr. Hyde films
1920s science fiction horror films
1920 horror films
1920s American films
Silent science fiction horror films
1920s English-language films